The Wausau Woodchucks are an American baseball team that plays in the Northwoods League, a collegiate summer baseball league. They play their home games at Athletic Park in Wausau, Wisconsin.

History
The team was known as the Wausau Woodchucks from 1994 to 1998, but the team name was changed to Wisconsin Woodchucks for the 1999 season, as they were the only remaining team in Wisconsin in the league at that time.

The team filled the void left by the Wausau Timbers of the Class A Midwest League, who relocated after the 1990 season to Geneva, Illinois, to become the Kane County Cougars.

In 1998 Clark Eckhoff purchased The Wisconsin Woodchucks, and Eckhoff truly made an impact on the team as well as the community as a whole.  Not only did attendance dramatically increase with Eckhoff as owner, but the Woodchucks would go on to win two league championships in 2001 and 2003.

The 'Chucks gained some star power for the 2007 season, as former Milwaukee Brewer and University of Wisconsin–Oshkosh product Jim Gantner managed the team. Gantner has been involved with the Brewers in various capacities since his retirement in 1992, including some coaching, but the Woodchucks job is his first managerial experience. Gantner, a native Wisconsinite who owns a second home in Boulder Junction, is familiar with the Wausau area and had expressed interest] in coaching college-age players.

On February 2, 2022, the Woodchucks announced their return as the Wausau Woodchucks, with a new logo and color scheme.

Players
A number of major leaguers and other notables have worn a Woodchucks uniform:

 Dave Gassner, 1998 (Hortonville, Wisconsin, native, LHP with Minnesota Twins)
 Casey Janssen, 2001 (RHP, Toronto Blue Jays)
 Mark Lowe, 2002–03 (RHP, Texas Rangers)
 Pat Neshek, 2000 (Madison, Wisconsin, native, former relief pitcher with Twins)
 Wes Obermueller, 1995 (former relief pitcher with Florida Marlins)
 Kevin Pillar, 2010 (outfielder with New York Mets)
 Ned Yost Jr., 2003 (son of former player and manager of the Brewers and manager of the Kansas City Royals Ned Yost)
 Steve Foster (baseball), 2003 (Pitching coach, with Colorado Rockies)
 Ben Zobrist,  2003–04 2 time World Series champion and World series MVP with the Chicago Cubs (2016)
 Darin Ruf (Outfielder with the San Francisco Giants)
 Pat Venditte, 2008 (Made his major league debut on June 5, 2015, with the Oakland Athletics getting much publicity for being a Switch pitcher)
Notes
 Ben Zobrist and Pat Neshek are the only two to play in an MLB All-Star Game (Zobrist in 2009,2013,2016 and Neshek in 2014)

References

External links
 Wausau Woodchucks – official site
 Northwoods League – official site

Northwoods League teams
Sports in Wausau, Wisconsin
Amateur baseball teams in Wisconsin